Subject to Change is a pop album by Vanessa-Mae, released in the UK by EMI on 14 May 2001. The opening track, "Yantra", features vocals by Le Mystère des Voix Bulgares.

Track listing
 "Yantra" (Vanessa-Mae, Youth) – 5:52
 "White Bird" (David LaFlamme) – 5:33
 "Picante" (Vanessa-Mae, Youth) – 2:57
 "Destiny" (Vanessa-Mae, Youth) – 6:48
 "Night Flight" (Vanessa-Mae, Youth) – 4:41
 "Clear Like Ice" (Vanessa-Mae, Youth) – 5:09
 "Laughing Buddha" (Vanessa-Mae, Youth) – 6:08
 "Pasha" (Vanessa-Mae, Youth) – 4:27
 "Solace" (Vanessa-Mae, Youth) – 4:33
 "Love is Only a Game" (Vanessa-Mae, Youth) – 2:53
 "Deep South" (Vanessa-Mae, Youth) – 6:19
 "Jamais" (Vanessa-Mae, Youth) – 9:06

Chart performance

References
  

Vanessa-Mae albums
2001 albums
Albums produced by Youth (musician)
EMI Records albums
Classical crossover albums